Falso is the fourth studio album of the Italian band Punkreas, released in 2002.

Track listing
 Dividi e comanda - 3:50
 Canapa - 3:23
 Volare - 3:04
 Elettrosmog - 3:12
 Mondo proibito - 3:34
 Più di voi - 3:15
 W.T.O. (Viva il Terrorismo Organizzato) - 3:25
 Falsa - 4:02
 Gran galà - 3:11
 Solo andata - 2:47
 Toda la noche - 4:10

References

2002 albums
Punkreas albums